Kim Eui-Tae (김의태, born 2 June 1941) is a Korean former judoka who competed in the 1964 Summer Olympics and in the 1972 Summer Olympics.

References

1941 births
Living people
Olympic judoka of South Korea
Judoka at the 1964 Summer Olympics
Judoka at the 1972 Summer Olympics
Olympic bronze medalists for South Korea
Olympic medalists in judo
South Korean male judoka
Medalists at the 1964 Summer Olympics
20th-century South Korean people